Conasprella arcuata, common name the arched cone, is a species of sea snail, a marine gastropod mollusk in the family Conidae, the cone snails and their allies.

Like all species within the genus Conus, these cone snails are predatory and venomous. They are capable of "stinging" humans, therefore live ones should be handled carefully or not at all.

Description
The size of the shell varies between 35 mm and 60 mm.

Distribution
This marine species occurs in the Gulf of California, and in the Pacific Ocean from Mexico to Peru. Type locality near Mazatlán, Sinaloa, Mexico.

References

 Broderip W. J. & Sowerby G. B. (1829). Observations on new or interesting mollusca contained, for the most part, in the Museum of the Zoological Society. Zoological Journal, 4: 359–379, pl. 9
 Puillandre N., Duda T.F., Meyer C., Olivera B.M. & Bouchet P. (2015). One, four or 100 genera? A new classification of the cone snails. Journal of Molluscan Studies. 81: 1–23

External links
 The Conus Biodiversity website
Cone Shells – Knights of the Sea
 

arcuata
Gastropods described in 1829